Ptyas carinata, commonly known as the keeled rat snake, is a species of colubrid snake. It is found in Indonesia, Myanmar, Malaysia, Thailand, Philippines, Cambodia, India, Vietnam, and Singapore. This little known species is probably the largest extant species in the diverse colubrid family that includes just over half of living snake species. Males reportedly average slightly larger than females. They are probably opportunistic predators on a variety of prey, such as rodents, though adult lizards are thought to be significant prey in Indonesia.

References

External links
 Photo by Noel Thomas - MacRitchie North Central Catchment Nature Reserve, Singapore
 Photo by John Varigos - Mt Rimau, Sipitang - Malaysia
 Species of Doi Suthep-Pui National Park
 Ptyas carinata in Thailand

Colubrids
Reptiles of Thailand
Reptiles of Indonesia
Reptiles of Malaysia
Reptiles of the Philippines
Reptiles of Cambodia
Reptiles of Vietnam
Reptiles of Myanmar
Taxa named by Albert Günther
Reptiles described in 1858
Snakes of Vietnam
Snakes of Asia
Taxobox binomials not recognized by IUCN
Reptiles of Borneo